"I'm Already There" is a song recorded by American country music band Lonestar, written by lead singer Richie McDonald along with Gary Baker and Frank J. Myers. It was released in March 2001 as the lead-off single to their fourth studio album of the same name. It spent six weeks at the top of the Billboard Hot Country Singles & Tracks chart. The song was the band's fifth consecutive Number One, and their seventh overall.

Content
In the song, McDonald narrates about a man who is on the road, and the lyric explains how the man feels and how his family is responding to his absence. This also explains how much the man loves his family, and how much they mean to him. He then says that he will always be there for them in spirit, even though he is separated from them physically. The song became associated with the September 11 attacks (even though it was released before the attacks) along with family members being deployed and returning from deployment, and has been heard many times on Good Morning America. Due to its tone and subject matter, "I’m Already There" is considered one of Lonestar’s darker songs, alongside "Not a Day Goes By", their 2002 single revolving around breakups.

On their 2003 greatest-hits package From There to Here: Greatest Hits, Lonestar included a "Message from Home" version which included dubbed-in telephone calls placed by family members of soldiers. This version also lacks the line "And I'll gently kiss your lips / Touch you with my fingertips" from the second verse.

Music video
The music video premiered on CMT on June 7, 2001 and it was directed by Michael Salomon. On April 21, 2003, they released another version of the music video to recast the song as a tribute to the military. This version is the one that is most-played on TV. The band's performance was shot at Nashville's Union Station Hotel.

Track listing
US vinyl 7" single
"I'm Already There" – 4:13
"Tell Her" – 3:36

US promo CD single
"I'm Already There" (Rhett Mix RES Short Intro) – 4:06
"I'm Already There" (Rhett Mix RES Vocal Up) – 4:14
"I'm Already There" (Rhett Mix RES Short Intro Vocal Up) – 4:12
"I'm Already There" (Huff's Stuff Guitar Down Mix) – 4:12
"I'm Already There" (Suggested Hook) – 0:10

UK CD single
"I'm Already There" (Huff Mix) – 4:12
"Every Little Thing She Does" – 3:13
"What About Now" (Remix) – 3:27

Australia CD single
"I'm Already There" (Single Version) – 4:11
"I'm Already There" (Album Version) – 4:13
"Amazed" – 4:02

Critical reception
Andrea Dresdale of Rolling Stone cited the song as a standout track on the album, calling it "a finely detailed snapshot of everyday life that'll have anyone in a long distance relationship reaching for the Kleenex."

Charts

Weekly charts

Year-end charts

Certifications

Westlife version

A cover of the song is the fourth track on the ninth studio album of Westlife, Back Home. It entered the UK download chart at #74 after "The Westlife Show" in December 2007. The song was not released as a single but peaked at #62 on the Official UK Singles Chart.

In 2008 on Series 5 of X Factor in the United Kingdom, JLS performed the Westlife version and it re-entered the UK charts at #106 and peaked at #63. It entered the Official Irish Singles Chart at #47.

The song has been performed on 3 tours: The Where We Are Tour (2010), The Gravity Tour (2011) and The Wild Dreams Tour (2022).

References

2001 singles
Lonestar songs
Westlife songs
2007 singles
Songs written by Frank J. Myers
Song recordings produced by Dann Huff
Music videos directed by Michael Salomon
Songs written by Gary Baker (songwriter)
Songs written by Richie McDonald
BNA Records singles
Country ballads
2001 songs
Song recordings produced by Quiz & Larossi